Ivanhoe is an 1820 novel by Sir Walter Scott.

Ivanhoe may also refer to:

Films
 Ivanhoe (1913 British film)
 Ivanhoe (1913 American film), an IMP/Universal silent film starring King Baggot
 Ivanhoe (1952 film), an MGM film starring Robert Taylor
 Ivanhoe (1982 film), a TV movie starring Anthony Andrews
 Ivanhoe, a 1986 animated film produced by Burbank Films Australia

TV series
Ivanhoe (1958 TV series), featuring Roger Moore
Ivanhoe (1970 TV series), starring Eric Flynn
Ivanhoe (1997 TV series), starring Steven Waddington

Operas
Ivanhoé, an 1826 pastiche opera with music by Gioachino Rossini
Ivanhoe (opera), by Arthur Sullivan (1891)

Places

Australia 
Ivanhoe, Victoria, Melbourne Region, a suburb
Electoral district of Ivanhoe (Victoria), a current electorate in the Victorian Legislative Assembly
Ivanhoe, New South Wales, Far West Region
Ivanhoe (Warakirri) Correctional Centre, a minimum security prison at Ivanhoe, New South Wales, Australia
Electoral district of Ivanhoe (Western Australia), an abolished electorate in the Western Australian Legislative Assembly
Ivanhoe Station, a pastoral station in Western Australia

Canada
 Ivanhoe, Newfoundland and Labrador, a former settlement
 Ivanhoe, a community in Centre Hastings, Ontario
 Ivanhoe Lake, Ontario
 Ivanhoe River, Ontario

United States 
 Ivanhoe, California, a census-designated place
 Ivanhoe, Georgia, an unincorporated community
 Ivanhoe, Illinois, an unincorporated community
 Ivanhoe, Gary, Indiana, a neighborhood infamous for its housing project
 Ivanhoe, Iowa, a village
 Ivanhoe, an unincorporated community in Sheridan Township, Huron County, Michigan
 Ivanhoe, Minnesota, a city
 Ivanhoe, North Carolina, a census-designated place
 Ivanhoe, Fannin County, Texas, an unincorporated community
 Ivanhoe, Tyler County, Texas, a city
 Ivanhoe, Virginia, a census-designated place
 Ivanhoe mining district, Elko County, Nevada
 Lake Ivanhoe (New Hampshire)
 Ivanhoe Reservoir, part of the Silver Lake Reservoir in Los Angeles, California

Schools
Ivanhoe School, a secondary school in Ashby-de-la-Zouch, Leicestershire, England
Ivanhoe Girls' Grammar School, an independent Anglican school for girls in Ivanhoe, Victoria, Australia
Ivanhoe Grammar School, an independent co-educational Anglican school in Ivanhoe, Victoria, Australia

People
 Ivan Barrow (1911–1979), cricketer for the West Indies
 Vincent "Ivanhoe" Martin (1924–1948), Jamaican outlaw and folk hero who is also known as Rhyging
 Ivanhoe "Ivan" Martin, fictional protagonist of the 1972 film The Harder They Come; based on Vincent "Ivanhoe" Martin
 Philip J. Ivanhoe (born 1954), leading scholar of Chinese philosophy

Businesses
 Ivanhoe Bus Company, a bus and coach operator in Melbourne, Victoria, Australia
 Ivanhoe's Restaurant, a drive-in ice cream stand and family owned restaurant in Upland, Indiana, United States
 Ivanhoe Mines, former name of Turquoise Hill Resources, a Canadian mineral exploration and development company

Rail transportation
 Ivanhoe Line, a railway line in England
 Ivanhoe station (Illinois), a commuter rail station in Riverdale, Illinois
 Ivanhoe railway station, Melbourne, a railway station in Melbourne, Victoria, Australia
 Ivanhoe railway station, New South Wales, a railway station in Ivanhoe, New South Wales, Australia

Other uses
 HMS Ivanhoe, two Royal Navy destroyers
 Ivanhoe Masonic Temple, Kansas City, Missouri, formerly on the National Register of Historic Places, demolished in 1999
 IVANHOE (software), an educational game

See also
 Ivanhoe East, Victoria, Melbourne Region
 Ivanhoe Estates, Florida, a census-designated place
 Ivanhoé Cambridge, a Montreal-based real estate firm
 Ivanoe Bonomi (1873–1951), Prime Minister of Italy
 Ivinghoe, a village and civil parish in England